Claudina Rossel Badia (born 12 July 1969) is an Andorran alpine skier. She competed in two events at the 1988 Winter Olympics. She was the first woman to represent Andorra at the Olympics.

Notes

References

External links
 
 

1969 births
Living people
Andorran female alpine skiers
Olympic alpine skiers of Andorra
Alpine skiers at the 1988 Winter Olympics
Place of birth missing (living people)